The 1948–53 Central European International Cup was the fifth edition of the Central European International Cup played between 1948 and 1953. It was played in a round robin tournament between five teams involved in the tournament.

Final standings

Matches

This match between Hungary and Czechoslovakia also counted for the 1948 Balkan Cup.

Winner

Statistics

Goalscorers

See also
Balkan CupBaltic CupNordic CupMediterranean Cup

References

External links

Central European International Cup